"You Saved My Soul" is a 1981 single by Canadian musician Burton Cummings, from the 1981 album Sweet Sweet. The single reached the top 40 in Canada and the U.S., and also charted on the Adult Contemporary charts of both countries, peaking at numbers 12 and 22, respectively.

Originally written and recorded for the film Melanie, which starred Cummings and Glynnis O'Connor as a man and woman entering into a romantic relationship, the song won the Genie Award for Best Original Song at the 4th Genie Awards.

References

1981 singles
Burton Cummings songs
Songs written by Burton Cummings
1981 songs